ZFP82 zinc finger protein is a protein that in humans is encoded by the ZFP82 gene.

References

Further reading 

Molecular biology
Proteins
Proteomics